St Michael's Catholic College is a coeducational secondary school with academy status, located in the London district of Southwark.

Specialising in Business and Enterprise and Modern Foreign Languages, St Michael's teaches students in the age range of 11–18 years.

The college was rebuilt in January 2011 under the BSF (Building Schools for Future) and opened a sixth form.  A new teaching block was opened in September 2018 to allow the College to expand its capacity to a maximum of 1050 students by 2023.

In 2014 the school achieved examination results above the national average, and was rated "outstanding| by Ofsted in 2011 and 2013.

Houses 
St' Michaels Catholic College has six houses, named as follows.
 Saint John Bosco
 Saint Mary Mazzerello
 Saint Dominic Savio
 Blessed Laura Vicuña
 Blessed Michael Rua
 Blessed Alexandria Da costa

References

Secondary schools in the London Borough of Southwark
Educational institutions with year of establishment missing
Catholic secondary schools in the Archdiocese of Southwark
Academies in the London Borough of Southwark
Bermondsey